Alejandro Falla was the defending champion but chose not to compete.
Federico Delbonis defeated Facundo Bagnis 6–3, 6–2 in the final to win the title.

Seeds

Draw

Finals

Top half

Bottom half

References
 Main Draw
 Qualifying Draw

Seguros Bolivar Open Barranquilla - Singles
2013 Singles